Dr. Rajendra Prasad Stadium is situated in Margao, Goa, India. It is the home ground of the Goa cricket team. It has a capacity of 5,000 people and was opened in 1954.

Matches
 Goa vs Jammu Kashmir. (Details)
 Goa vs Jharkhand. (Details)
 Goa vs Himachal Pradesh. (Details)
 Goa vs Maharashtra.
 Goa vs Rajasthan. (Detais)
 Goa vs Assam. (Details)

External links
 Dr Rajendra Prasad Stadium at Cricinfo
 Dr Rajendra Prasad Stadium, Margao at CricketArchive
 Dr. Rajendra Prasad Stadium, Margao - Goa. MARGAO CRICKET CLUB

1954 establishments in Portuguese India
Cricket grounds in Goa
Memorials to Rajendra Prasad
Buildings and structures in Margao
Sports venues completed in 1954
20th-century architecture in India